Gauche caviar ("Caviar left") is a pejorative French term to describe someone who claims to be a socialist while living in a way that contradicts socialist values. The expression is a political neologism dating from the 1980s and implies a degree of hypocrisy. The dictionary Petit Larousse defines left caviar as a pejorative expression for a "Progressivism combined with a taste for society life and its accoutrements". One description referred to it as "the free-thinking, authority-hating, individualistic, tolerant, socialist position... which shaded into a bohemian, existential, communitarian, fairly depressed" worldview espoused by people with money and good clothes.

The concept is broadly similar to the English Champagne socialist, the American Limousine liberal or latte liberal,  the German Salonkommunist or Champagnersozialist, the Dutch salonsocialist, the Italian Radical chic, the Polish kawiorowa lewica, the Portuguese esquerda caviar, the Spanish pijoprogre, the Argentinian Spanish zurdo con osde, the Chilean Spanish red set, and the Danish Kystbanesocialist, referring to well-off coastal neighborhoods north of Copenhagen. Other similar terms in English include Hampstead liberal, liberal elite, chardonnay socialist, smoked salmon socialist, and Bollinger Bolshevik.

Usage 
The term was once prevalent in Parisian circles, applied deprecatingly to those who professed allegiance to the Socialist Party, but who maintained a far from proletarian lifestyle that distinguished them from the working-class base of the French Socialist Party. A more explicit reference identified this group as left-wingers who speak with great passion about the plight of the poor while eating caviar in their spectacular Parisian duplex apartment.

The label was also employed by detractors to describe François Mitterrand. This was further reinforced by the fact that several members of his administration were identified as part of the gauche caviar such as Jack Lang, who was the culture minister.

In early 2007, Ségolène Royal was identified with the gauche caviar when it was revealed that she had been avoiding paying taxes. The description damaged her campaign for the French presidency. Similarly French politician  Bernard Kouchner and his wife Christine Ockrent have been labelled with the term. However, his appointment as Minister of Foreign Affairs was not hampered by the label. Other supposed members of this gauche caviar include Dominique Strauss-Kahn, the former IMF managing director, and his wife, the journalist Anne Sinclair, heiress to much of the fortune of her maternal grandfather, the art dealer Paul Rosenberg. It is said that around 2015, the gauche caviar supported also the Greek government of SYRIZA and PM Tsipras, "desperate for a new 'anti-imperialist hero' after Hugo Chavez's death".

Similarly, Emmanuel Macron has been accused by opponents of being the archetype of this label, claiming a socialist background while implementing right wing policies. Since the beginning of his term, these accusations have contributed to a growth in his unpopularity. 

The weekly news magazine, Le Nouvel Observateur, has been described as the "quasi-official organ of France's 'gauche caviar'".

Regardless of whether gauche caviar is accepted by those given such label, politicians who fit this classification wield power in the French polity. For instance, during the administration of Mitterrand, a number of policies were adopted to avoid offending this group, which included the Gais pour la liberte (Gays for freedom).

See also 
Baizuo
Armchair revolutionary
Armchair warrior
Chickenhawk

References

Further reading 

Class-related slurs
Metaphors referring to food and drink
Political metaphors referring to people
Politics of France